Parliamentary elections were held in Albania on 22 March 1992, with a second round of voting for eleven seats on 29 March. The result was a victory for the opposition Democratic Party of Albania, which won 92 of the 140 seats. After the election Aleksandër Meksi became Prime Minister and Sali Berisha became President.

Results

References

Parliamentary elections in Albania
Albania
1992 in Albania
March 1992 events in Europe
Election and referendum articles with incomplete results